The Soviet Union national badminton team represented the Soviet Union in international badminton team competitions. The Soviet national team have only participated twice in the international events, namely the Sudirman Cup. The team's last ever competition was the 1991 Sudirman Cup, months before the USSR was dissolved.

Prior to the dissolution, the national team were active in participating in the USSR International badminton tournament, where most of its players have won.

Participation in BWF competitions
The Soviet team participated in the first Sudirman Cup in 1989. The team were placed in Group 2. They finished in 10th place on the ranking. The Soviet team competed in their final tournament at the 1991 Sudirman Cup in Copenhagen, Denmark. The team was placed into Group 3 with Scotland, Thailand and Canada. The Soviet team won both ties against Scotland and Canada with a tight score of 4-1 and 3-2 respectively. They lost the tie with Thailand and were placed 12th in the rankings.

Sudirman Cup

Participation in Helvetia Cup 
The Helvetia Cup or European B Team Championships was a European mixed team championship in badminton. The first Helvetia Cup tournament took place in Zurich, Switzerland in 1962. The tournament took place every two years from 1971 until 2007, after which it was dissolved. The Soviet Union hosted the tournament in 1977.

Participation in European Junior Team Badminton Championships
Mixed Team

Squad 
Before the dissolution of the USSR, the following players were selected to represent the country in international tournaments.

Male players
Pavel Uvarov
Andreij Antropov
Nikolai Zuyev
Vitaly Shmakov
Anatoliy Skripko
Sergey Sevryukov

Female players
Natalja Ivanova
Elena Rybkhina
Vlada Chernyavskaya
Vlada Beljutina
Irina Rozhkova
Viktoria Pron

References

Badminton
National badminton teams
Badminton in the Soviet Union